Sluštice is a municipality and village in Prague-East District in the Central Bohemian Region of the Czech Republic. It has about 700 inhabitants.

Etymology
The name Sluštice is derived from sluha (meaning "servant"). The meaning of the name is "village of servants".

Geography
It is located in the Prague Plateau. The Výmola brook flows through the municipality.

History
The first written record dates back to 1223 when the village was a property of Mstidruh of Sluštice. The parish church was founded in 1223, the stronghold was first mentioned in 1416.

In 1519 it was bought by Marta Pechancová of Bezděkov. At that time the stronghold was not inhabited, the village was controlled from Královice and Křenice and the local stronghold ceased to exist. The village of Sluštice belonged to the Královice and Křenice estates.

In 1623 (at the time of the Thirty Years' War) Sluštice was confiscated, sold to the Prince Karl I of Liechtenstein and incorporated into the estate of Škvorec with which it shared its fate.

Sights
The Church of Saint James the Great was built in the Baroque style in 1746–1749, after the original Gothic church from the 13th century was badly damaged by a fire in 1716. The roof and a part of the façade of the church were restored in 2006.

In popular culture
In the school building a part of the comedy The Snowdrop Festival was filmed.

References

External links

Villages in Prague-East District